Politics of Algeria takes place in a framework of a constitutional semi-presidential republic, whereby the President of Algeria is head of state while the Prime Minister of Algeria is the head of government. Executive power is exercised by the government. Legislative power is vested in both the government and the two chambers of parliament, the  People's National Assembly and the Council of the Nation. A legacy of Algeria's bloody War of Independence from France (where an estimated 1.5 million Algerians were killed) is a powerful military and security apparatus that put a high value on secrecy. 
Since 1988, parties other than the ruling FLN have been allowed and multiparty elections have been held, but freedom of political speech, protest and assembly is circumscribed, and the 2014 presidential election was boycotted by major opposition parties. Algeria has been called a "controlled democracy", or a state where the military and "a select group" of unelected civilians—reportedly known to Algerians as "le pouvoir" ("the power")—make major decisions, such as who should be president.

Since the early 1990s, a shift from a socialist to a free market economy has been ongoing with official support.

History
The civil war resulted in more than 100,000 deaths since 1991. However, Algerians believe that the national death count was close to 3,000,000.  Although the security situation in the country has greatly improved, addressing the underlying issues which brought about the political turmoil of the 1990s remains the government's major task. The government officially lifted the state of emergency declared in 1999.

Constitution
Under the 1976 Constitution (as modified 1979, and amended in 1988, 1989, and 1996) Algeria is a multi-party state. All parties must be approved by the Ministry of the Interior. To date, Algeria has had more than 40 legal political parties. According to the Constitution, no political association may be formed if it is "based on differences in religion, language, race, gender, or region."

Informal power
While many sources agree that the real power in Algeria is not held by its constitutional organs, they differ as to who/what does.  According to the Economist magazine, the military is the primary powerbroker, along with "a select group" of unelected civilians. These "décideurs" are reportedly known to Algerians as "le pouvoir" ("the power"), make major decisions, including who should be president.  Adam Nossiter of the New York Times states "Algerian politics is still dominated" by men from the ruling party, the FLN. Moroccan-Italian journalist  Anna Mahjar-Barducci, writing in Haaretz, insists the FLN "is a group of apparatchiks constantly fighting each other when they're not tending to the businesses ... with which they have rewarded themselves from their positions of power". According to Mahjar-Barducci, real power is held by "the military's Department of Intelligence and Security (DRS)."

Executive branch

The head of state is the President of the republic, who is elected to a 5-year term, renewable once (changed by the 2008 Constitution to an infinite mandate but reinstated in 2016). Algeria has universal suffrage. The President is the head of the Council of Ministers and of the High Security Council. He appoints the Prime Minister who also is the head of government. The Prime Minister appoints the Council of Ministers.

|President
|Abdelmadjid Tebboune
|Independent
|19 December 2019
|-
|Prime Minister
|Aymen Benabderrahmane
|Independent
|30 June 2021
|}

Parliament of Algeria

People's National Assembly

The People's National Assembly has less power relative to the executive branch than many parliaments and has been described as "rubber-stamping" laws proposed by the president.

As of 2012 there were 462 seats in parliament. In the May 2012 election the government reported a 42.9% turnout, though the BBC reported that correspondents saw "only a trickle of voters" at polling places. In that election 44 political parties participated with the ruling National Liberation Front winning more than any other group—220 seats—and an alliance of moderate Islamists coming in second with 66 seats. The Islamists disputed the results.

Council of the Nation

Political parties and elections

In keeping with its amended Constitution, the Algerian Government espouses participatory democracy and free-market competition. The government has stated that it will continue to open the political process and encourage the creation of political institutions. More than 40 political parties, representing a wide segment of the population, are currently active in Algerian national politics. The most recent legislative election was 2012. President Bouteflika pledged to restructure the state as part of his overall reform efforts. However, no specifics are yet available as to how such reforms would affect political structures and the political process itself.

In the 2002 elections, there were 17,951,127 eligible voters, and 8,288,536 of them actually voted which made a turn out of 46.17%. Out of the ballots cast, there were 867,669 void ballots according to the Interior ministry and 7,420,867 which went to the various candidates.

Legislative elections
The most recent legislative election now is the 2017 one:

Presidential elections

Administrative divisions
Algeria is divided into 58 wilaya (province) headed by walis (governors) who report to the Minister of Interior. Each wilaya is further divided into daïras, themselves divided in communes. The wilayas and communes are each governed by an elected assembly.

Media
Algeria has more than 30 daily newspapers published in French and Arabic, with a total publication run of more than 1.5 million copies. Although relatively free to write as they choose, in 2001, the government amended the penal code provisions relating to defamation and slander, a step widely viewed as an effort to rein in the press. Government monopoly of newsprint and advertising is seen as another means to influence the press, although it has permitted newspapers to create their own printing distribution networks.

See also List of Algerian newspapers.

Future concerns
Population growth and associated problems—unemployment and underemployment, inability of social services to keep pace with rapid urban migration, inadequate industrial management and productivity, a decaying infrastructure—continue to plague Algerian society. Increases in the production and prices of oil and gas over the past decade have led to a budgetary surplus of close to $20 billion. The government began an economic reform program in 1993 which focuses on macroeconomic stability and structural reform. These reforms are aimed at liberalizing the economy, making Algeria competitive in the global market, and meeting the needs of the Algerian people.

International organization participation 
AU, ABEDA, AfDB, AFESD, AL, AMF, AMU, ECA, FAO, G-15, G-19, G-24, G-77, IAEA, IBRD, ICAO, ICFTU, ICRM, IDA, IDB, IFAD, IFC, IFRCS, IHO, ILO, IMF, International Maritime Organization, Inmarsat, Intelsat, Interpol, INTOSAI, IOC, IOM (observer), ISO, ITU, MONUC, NAM, OAPEC, OAS (observer), OIC, OPCW, OPEC, OSCE (partner), UN, UNCTAD, UNESCO, UNHCR, UNIDO, UNWTO, UPU, WCL, WCO, WHO, WIPO, WMO, WTO (applicant)

See also

2010–2011 Algerian protests
Censorship in Algeria
Ministry of Justice (Algeria)
Government Palace (Algiers)
El Mouradia Palace

Notes

References

External links